James Reid Campbell, Jr. (December 4, 1893 – November 1981) was an American politician. He was a member of the Arkansas House of Representatives, serving from 1929 to 1932 and from 1935 to 1954. He was a member of the Democratic party.

References

1981 deaths
1893 births
People from Tuskegee, Alabama
20th-century American politicians
Speakers of the Arkansas House of Representatives
Democratic Party members of the Arkansas House of Representatives